Anil Kumar Jain (born 1948) is an Indian-American computer scientist and University Distinguished Professor in the Department of Computer Science & Engineering at Michigan State University, known for his contributions in the fields of pattern recognition, computer vision and biometric recognition. Based on his Google Scholar profile, he has an h-index of 208, which is the highest among computer scientists identified in a survey published by UCLA.

Biography 
Born in India, Anil K. Jain received his Bachelor of Technology in electrical engineering from the Indian Institute of Technology, Kanpur in 1969. He received his MS and PhD from the Ohio State University in 1970 and 1973, respectively. His PhD advisor was Robert B. McGhee, and his PhD thesis was titled "Some Aspects of Dimensionality and Sample Size Problems in Statistical Pattern Recognition". Jain taught at Wayne State University from 1972 to 1974 and joined the faculty of Michigan State University in 1974, where he is currently a University Distinguished Professor.

Jain is an ISI Highly Cited researcher. In 2016, he was elected to the National Academy of Engineering and Indian National Academy of Engineering  "for contributions to the engineering and practice of biometrics".  In 2007, he received the W. Wallace McDowell Award, the highest technical honor awarded by the IEEE Computer Society, for his pioneering contributions to theory, technique, and practice of pattern recognition, computer vision, and biometric recognition systems.  He has also received numerous other awards, including the Guggenheim Fellowship, Humboldt Research Award, IAPR Pierre Devijver Award, Fulbright Fellowship, IEEE Computer Society Technical Achievement award, IAPR King-Sun Fu Prize, and IEEE ICDM Research Contribution Award.  He is a Fellow of the ACM, IEEE, AAAS, IAPR and SPIE. He also received best paper awards from the IEEE Transactions on Neural Networks (1996) and the Pattern Recognition journal (1987, 1991, and 2005).

He served as a member of the U.S. National Academies panels on Information Technology, Whither Biometrics and Improvised Explosive Devices (IED). He also served as a member of the Defense Science Board, Forensic Science Standards Board, and AAAS Latent Fingerprint Working Group. In 2019, he was elected a Foreign Member of the Chinese Academy of Sciences

Anil Jain was conferred Doctor Honoris Causa by the Hong Kong University of Science and Technology in 2021 and by the Universidad Autónoma de Madrid in 2018.

Selected publications

Books 
 1988. Algorithms For Clustering Data. With Richard C. Dubes. Prentice Hall.
 1993. Markov Random Fields: Theory and Applications.  With Rama Chellappa eds. Academic Press. 
 1999. Biometrics: Personal Identification in Networked Society. With Ruud M. Bolle and Sharath Pankanti eds. Springer.
 2003. Handbook of Fingerprint Recognition. (2nd edition 2008). With D. Maio, D. Maltoni, S. Prabhakar. Springer.
 2005. Handbook of Face Recognition. (2nd edition 2011). With S. Z. Li ed. Springer.
 2006. Handbook of Multibiometrics. With A. Ross and K. Nandakumar. Springer.
 2007. Handbook of Biometrics. With P. Flynn and A. Ross eds. Springer.
 2011. Introduction to Biometrics. With A. Ross and K. Nandakumar. Springer.
 2015. Encyclopedia of Biometrics (Second Edition). With Stan Li. Springer.

Research articles 
 Cross, George R. and Anil K. Jain.  "Markov random field texture models". IEEE Transactions on Pattern Analysis and Machine Intelligence (1983): 25-39.
 Jain, Anil K., and Farshid Farrokhnia. "Unsupervised texture segmentation using Gabor filters". Pattern Recognition 24.12 (1991): 1167-1186.
 Jain, Anil K., and Douglas Zongker.  "Feature selection: Evaluation, application, and small sample performance". IEEE Transactions on Pattern Analysis and Machine Intelligence, 19.2 (1997): 153-158.
 Jain Anil K., L Hong, S Pankanti, R Bolle. "An Identity-Authentication System using Fingerprints" Proceedings of the IEEE, 85.9 (1997): 1365-1388.
 Hsu, Rein-Lien, Mohamed Abdel-Mottaleb, and Anil K. Jain. "Face detection in color images". IEEE Transactions on Pattern Analysis and Machine Intelligence, 24.5 (2002): 696-706.
 Figueiredo, Mario A.T. and Anil K. Jain. "Unsupervised learning of finite mixture models". IEEE Transactions on Pattern Analysis and Machine Intelligence, 24.3 (2004): 381-396.

Survey articles 
 A.K. Jain, J. Mao, and M. Mohiuddin. "Artificial Neural Networks:  A Tutorial", IEEE  Computer, Vol. 29.3 (1996), 31-44.
 Jain, Anil K., M. Narasimha Murty, and Patrick J. Flynn. "Data clustering: a review". ACM Computing Surveys (CSUR) 31.3 (1999): 264-323.
 Jain, Anil K., Robert P. W. Duin, and Jianchang Mao. "Statistical pattern recognition: A review". IEEE Transactions on Pattern Analysis and Machine Intelligence, 22.1 (2000): 4-37.
 Jain, Anil K., Arun Ross, and Salil Prabhakar. "An Introduction to Biometric Recognition". IEEE Transactions on Circuits and Systems for Video Technology, 14.1 (2004): 4-20.
 Jain, Anil K. "Biometric Recognition: Q & A". Nature, Vol. 449, pp. 38–40, Sept. 2007.
 Jain, Anil K. "Data Clustering: 50 Years Beyond K-Means". Pattern Recognition Letters, Vol. 31, No. 8, pp. 651–666, June 2010.

References

External links 
 Anil K. Jain homepage at Michigan State University
 Biometrics research group at Michigan State University

1948 births
Living people
American computer scientists
Indian computer scientists
Computer vision researchers
Fellow Members of the IEEE
Fellows of SPIE
Fellows of the American Association for the Advancement of Science
Fellows of the Association for Computing Machinery
Members of the United States National Academy of Engineering
Foreign members of the Chinese Academy of Sciences
IIT Kanpur alumni
Michigan State University faculty
Ohio State University alumni
American Jains
American academics of Indian descent
Scientists from Michigan
20th-century American scientists
21st-century American scientists
Fellows of the International Association for Pattern Recognition